Fidaxomicin, sold under the brand name Dificid among others, is the first member of a class of narrow spectrum macrocyclic antibiotic drugs called tiacumicins. It is a fermentation product obtained from the actinomycete Dactylosporangium aurantiacum subspecies hamdenesis.  
Fidaxomicin is minimally absorbed into the bloodstream when taken orally, is bactericidal, and selectively eradicates pathogenic Clostridioides difficile with relatively little disruption to the multiple species of bacteria that make up the normal, healthy intestinal microbiota. The maintenance of normal physiological conditions in the colon may reduce the probability of recurrence of Clostridioides difficile infection.

It is marketed by Merck, which acquired Cubist Pharmaceuticals in 2015, and had in turn bought the originating company, Optimer Pharmaceuticals.  It is used for the treatment of Clostridioides difficile infection, which is also known as Clostridioides difficile-associated diarrhea or Clostridioides difficile-associated illness (CDI), and can develop into Clostridioides difficile colitis and pseudomembranous colitis.

Fidaxomicin is available in a 200 mg tablet that is administered every 12 hours for a recommended duration of 10 days. Total duration of therapy should be determined by the patient's clinical status. It is currently one of the most expensive antibiotics approved for use. A standard course costs upwards of £1350.

Mechanism
Fidaxomicin binds to and prevents movement of the "switch regions" of bacterial RNA polymerase. Switch motion occurs during the opening and closing of the DNA:RNA clamp, a process that occurs throughout RNA transcription but is especially important in the opening of double-stranded DNA during the initiation of transcription. It has minimal systemic absorption and a narrow spectrum of activity; it is active against Gram positive bacteria, especially clostridia.  The minimal inhibitory concentration (MIC) range for C. difficile (ATCC 700057) is 0.03–0.25 μg/mL.

Clinical trials
Good results were reported by the company in 2009, from a North American Phase III clinical trial comparing it with oral vancomycin for the treatment of Clostridioides difficile infection.  The study met its primary endpoint of clinical cure, showing that fidaxomicin was non-inferior to oral vancomycin (92.1% vs. 89.8%). In addition, the study met its secondary endpoint of recurrence: 13.3% of the subjects had a recurrence with fidaxomicin vs. 24.0% with oral vancomycin. The study also met its exploratory endpoint of global cure (77.7% for fidaxomicin vs. 67.1% for vancomycin). Clinical cure was defined as patients requiring no further therapy for the treatment of C. difficile infection two days after completion of study medication. Global cure was defined as patients who were cured at the end of therapy and did not have a recurrence in the next four weeks.

Fidaxomicin was shown to be as good as the standard-of-care, vancomycin, for treating Clostridioides difficile infection in a Phase III clinical trial published in February 2011. The authors also reported significantly fewer recurrences of infection, a frequent problem with C. difficile, and similar drug side effects.

Based on a multicenter clinical trial, fidaxomicin was reported well tolerated in children with Clostridioides difficile–associated diarrhea and has a pharmacokinetic profile in children similar to that in adults.

Regarding the high budget to spend for fidaxomicin, a systematic literature review published in 2017, showed that fidaxomicin was demonstrated to be cost-effective versus metronidazole and vancomycin in patients with Clostridioides difficile infection.

Approvals and indications
On April 5, 2011, the drug won an FDA advisory panel's unanimous approval for the treatment of Clostridioides difficile infection, and gained full FDA approval on May 27, 2011. As of January 2020, fidaxomicin is FDA-approved for use in children aged 6 months and older for C. difficile associated diarrhea (CDAD).

Adverse effects 
The most common side effects reported in adults with the use of fidaxomicin include nausea, abdominal pain, vomiting, anemia, neutropenia, and gastrointestinal hemorrhage. In children the most common side effects include fever, vomiting, diarrhea, constipation, abdominal pain, rash, and increased aminotransferases.

References

External links
 

Chloroarenes
Isobutyrate esters
Macrolide antibiotics
Merck & Co. brands
Orphan drugs
Phenols
RNA polymerase inhibitors
Antidiarrhoeals